Al-Buwayziyya was a Palestinian Arab village in the Safad Subdistrict. It was depopulated during the 1947–1948 Civil War in Mandatory Palestine on May 11, 1948, by the Palmach's First Battalion of Operation Yiftach. It was located 22 km northeast of Safad.

In the   1944/45 statistics  it had a population 510 Muslims. The village had elementary school for boys which was founded in 1937.

History

British Mandate era
In the 1922 census of Palestine conducted by the British Mandate authorities, Buaizia  had a population of 276, all Muslims,  increasing in the 1931 census to 318, still all  Muslims,  in  a total of 75  houses.

The population  were mostly engaged in agriculture and mainly grew citrus fruits, grains and vegetables. In 1944/45 it had a total of 14,620 dunum of land, of which  2,770 dunums was allocated to cereal farming, 56 dunums was used for irrigation and orchards, while 17 dunams were classified as urban (built-up) land.

1948, aftermath
The village was attacked by Israeli forces on 11 May 1948 as part of Operation Yiftach which depopulated eastern Galilee. According to Israeli historian Benny Morris, al-Buwayziyya’s residents fled when they learned that the neighboring village of al-Khalisa, 5 km to the north, had succumbed to Jewish forces and as a result the village had been evacuated after the Haganah declined the villagers’ request for conditional permission to stay.

In 1992, the village site was described: "On the site where al-Buwayziyya once stood are remains of destroyed houses, a few walls and terraces, and the (intact) concrete roof of one house.  The flat portion of the surrounding  lands are used by Israelis for agriculture; the more hilly lands serve as pasture."

References

Bibliography

External links
Welcome To al-Buwayziyya
al-Buwayziyya, Zochrot
Survey of Western Palestine, Map 4: IAA, Wikimedia commons
al-Buwayziyya at Khalil Sakakini Cultural Center
al-Buwayziyya, Dr. Khalil Rizk.

Arab villages depopulated during the 1948 Arab–Israeli War
District of Safad